, also called the "Geisha Facial", refers to the excrement produced by a particular nightingale, the Japanese bush warbler. The droppings have been used in facials throughout Japanese history. Recently, the product has appeared in the Western world. The facial is said to whiten the skin and balance skin tone, as well as treat skin affected by hyperpigmentation.

History

The use of nightingale excrement dates back to the Heian period (7941185) when it was introduced to the Japanese by the Korean people. Koreans used the guano to remove dye from fabric, allowing them to make intricate designs on clothing. The Japanese used the bird droppings to remove stains from silk garments such as kimono. During the Edo period (16031868), the Japanese expanded its use by using it as a beauty treatment. Geisha and kabuki actors used white makeup known as  that contained zinc and lead, which likely caused many issues such as skin diseases.  was used to thoroughly remove this makeup and to whiten the skin. Buddhist monks also used the droppings to polish and clean their bald scalps.

Currently, Hyakusuke is the last shop in Tokyo to sell government-approved . This 200 year-old cosmetic shop carries the powder along with other cosmetic products.

Processing

 is harvested in nightingale farms in Japan. Though wild nightingales eat insects and berries, the diet of the caged birds consists of organic seeds. Some nightingales feed on caterpillars that eat from plum trees. The guano is scraped from the cages, and an ultraviolet light is often used to kill the bacteria to sanitize it. The droppings are then usually dried with a dehydrator. Some are sun-dried for over two weeks while simultaneously being UV sterilized. Next, it is ground into a fine white powder, and it is sold in this form.

Facial
Rice bran is sometimes added to the guano for the purpose of exfoliation. The powder is mixed with water, yielding a paste, before being massaged into the skin for a few minutes and then being rinsed off. The facial is usually rather odorless and sanitized. The added rice bran can also neutralize the slight musky odor.

Mechanism of facial
The way the facial works is not entirely clear. The guano from the nightingale has a high concentration of urea and guanine. Because birds excrete a fecal and urine waste from a single opening, called the cloaca, the fecal-urine combination gives the droppings a high concentration of urea. Urea is sometimes found in cosmetics because it locks moisture into the skin. The guanine may produce shimmery, iridescent effects on the skin. It is claimed that because of the short intestine of the nightingale, the droppings have protein, a fat-degrading enzyme, and a whitening enzyme that acts on fat and scurf to whiten skin and even out blemishes.

Numerous sources comment that "the amino acid guanine" gives  its cosmetic properties, though guanine is a nucleotide base, not an amino acid.

In popular culture
Victoria Beckham, who has long suffered with acne, has used  to improve her skin. It was reported that Beckham admired the clarity of the skin of Japanese women and subsequently learned about the droppings.

In the novel Memoirs of a Geisha, the character Chiyo repays Hatsumomo's cruelty by mixing pigeon droppings with her face cream that contained unguent of nightingale droppings.

In the 2012 movie Mirror Mirror, based on the fairytale Snow White, the evil queen, played by Julia Roberts, undergoes extreme beauty treatments in order to woo a prince. The treatment begins with an application of bird droppings to her face.

References

Bibliography

External links

Cultural history of Japan
Feces
Geisha
Skin care
Traditional Japanese medicine